This page details the information on the matches and their outcomes for the 1976 African Cup of Nations.

Preliminary round

|}

Burundi won 2–1 on aggregate.

Tunisia won 3–2 on penalties after 1–1 on aggregate.

Togo won 3–0 on aggregate.

Morocco won 6–0 on aggregate.

Mali advanced after Lesotho withdrew.

Niger advanced after Dahomey withdrew.

First round

|}

Morocco won 5–2 on aggregate.

Tunisia won 3–2 on aggregate.

Uganda won 5–1 on aggregate.

Guinea won 7–2 on aggregate.

Sudan won 3–0 on aggregate.

Egypt won 5–0 on aggregate.

Ghana won 5–3 on aggregate.

Congo advanced by away goals rule after 2–2 on aggregate.

Zambia won 9–4 on aggregate.

Togo won 4–3 on aggregate.

Nigeria advanced after Central African Republic withdrew.

Tanzania advanced after Madagascar withdrew.

Second round

|}

Morocco won 6–5 on penalty shootout after 2–2 on aggregate.

Guinea won 4–2 on aggregate.

Egypt won 6–3 on aggregate.

Sudan won by away goals rule after 4–4 on aggregate.

Uganda won 4–2 on aggregate.

Nigeria won 3–1 on aggregate.

Qualified teams
The 8 qualified teams are:

References

External links
CAN 1976 details - 'rsssf.com'

Africa Cup of Nations qualification
Qualification
Qual